Quillota Province is one of eight provinces of the central Chilean region of Valparaíso (V). Its capital is the city of Quillota (pop. 75,916).

Administration
As a province, Quillota is a second-level administrative division, governed by a provincial delegate who is appointed by the president.

Communes
The province comprises five communes (Spanish: comunas), each governed by a municipality consisting of an alcalde and municipal council:
Quillota (capital)
La Calera
Nogales
Hijuelas
La Cruz

History
On March 11, 2010, the communes of Limache and Olmué were transferred to Marga Marga Province under Law 20,368 (signed August 25, 2009).

Geography and demography
According to the 2002 census, Quillota is the third most populous province in the region with a population of 175,917. At that time, there were 151,366 people living in urban areas, 24,551 people living in rural areas, 86,620 men and 89,297 women.

References

External links
  Official link

Provinces of Chile
Provinces of Valparaíso Region